Grünthal or Grunthal (German for green valley) may refer to:

Places
 Grunthal, a village located in the Hanover, Manitoba, Canada
 Grünthal, a part of Röthenbach an der Pegnitz
 Grünthal, a part of Wenzenbach in Bavaria
 Grunthal, see Kreis Kolmar in Posen
 Grunthal, former name of Verdun, Australia

People
 Marianne Grunthal (1896–1945), German educator
 Villem Grünthal-Ridala (1885–1942), Estonian poet, translator, linguist and folklorist
 Ivar Grünthal (dead 1996), Estonian author, poet and writer
 Timotheus Grünthal (dead 1955), politician

Other uses
 Grunthal CMC, Grunthal, Manitoba, Canada; a church, see Chortitzer Mennonite Conference
 Grünthal, a fictional martial arts academy in the manga Battle Angel Alita

See also
Green Valley (disambiguation)
Greendale (disambiguation)